{{Infobox College Soccer Team
|current = 2022 Creighton Bluejays men's soccer team
|name = Creighton Bluejays men's soccer
|logo = Creighton Bluejays wordmark.svg
|logo_size = 100
|university = Creighton University
|conference = Big East Conference
|conference_short = Big East
|founded = 1979
|division =
|city = Omaha
|stateabb = NE
|state = Nebraska
|coach = Johnny Torres
|tenure = 5th
|stadium = Morrison Stadium
|capacity = 6,000
|nickname = Bluejays

|pattern_la1 =
|pattern_b1 = _bluecross
|pattern_ra1 =
|leftarm1 = ffffff
|body1 = ffffff
|rightarm1 = ffffff
|shorts1 = ffffff
|socks1 = ffffff

|pattern_la2 =
|pattern_b2 = _whitecross
|pattern_ra2 =  
|leftarm2 =  005CA9
|body2 =  005CA9
|rightarm2 =  005CA9
|shorts2 =  005CA9
|socks2 = 005CA9

|NCAAchampion = 
|NCAArunnerup = 2000
|NCAAcollegecup = 1996, 2000, 2002, 2011, 2012, 2022
|NCAAeliteeight = 1996, 1998, 2000, 2002, 2003, 2005, 2008, 2011, 2012, 2014, 2015, 2022
|NCAAsecondround = 
|NCAAtourneys = 1992, 1993, 1994, 1995, 1996, 1997, 1998, 1999, 2000, 2001, 2002, 2003, 2004, 2005, 2006, 2007, 2008, 2010, 2011, 2012, 2013, 2014, 2015, 2016, 2021, 2022
|conference_tournament = Big East Conference2022 

Missouri Valley Conference1992, 1993, 1994, 1995, 1997, 1998, 2000, 2002, 2005, 2006, 2008, 2011, 2012
|conference_season = Big East Conference2014, 2018

Missouri Valley Conference1992, 1993, 1994, 1995, 1996, 2003, 2006, 2007, 2008, 2010, 2011, 2012
}}

The Creighton Bluejays men's soccer team represents Creighton University in NCAA men's Division I soccer competitions. They compete in the Big East Conference and have risen to prominence in collegiate men's soccer in the last few decades having gone to the NCAA Division I Men's Soccer Tournament in 22 of the previous 23 seasons, going back to 1992, with five appearances in the College Cup semifinals and one appearance in the National Championship Match. In conference play, the Bluejays have won 13 conference regular season championships and 13 conference tournament championships; the most recent being the 2014 Big East Conference Regular Season Championship. Creighton is the only soccer program in the nation to have at least one athlete taken in every Major League Soccer (MLS) draft from 1996 to 2014. They are currently coached by Johnny Torres.

History
The Creighton men's soccer team has made 22 NCAA Tournament appearances in the last 23 years going back to 1992. The Bluejays were runners-up in the NCAA tournament in 2000 losing in the National Championship Match to Connecticut. They have also reached the College Cup semifinal round in 1996, 2002, 2011, and 2012, and the Quarterfinal Round in 1998, 2000, 2003, 2005, 2008, and 2014.

Independent play and inactive period (1979–1990)
Creighton first fielded a men's soccer team in 1979. In 1980, the team began playing home games at Rosenblatt Stadium. After experiencing varied degrees of success, Creighton did not field a men's soccer team from 1986 to 1989. In 1990, the Bluejays resumed play and began playing their home games at Tranquility Park in western Omaha.

Missouri Valley Conference era (1991–2012)
In 1991, the men's soccer team began play in the Missouri Valley Conference where they experienced success early and often—winning four Missouri Valley Conference Regular Season Championships and four Missouri Valley Conference Tournament Championships in the team's first five years in the conference. The Creighton Soccer program entered a new era in 2003 with the opening of an on-campus soccer facility, the Michael G. Morrison, S.J., Stadium. The men's soccer team continued its success through the 2012 season—winning the team's 12th Missouri Valley Conference Regular Season Championship, 13th Missouri Valley Conference Tournament Championship, and advancing to the College Cup semifinal round for the fifth time. During their time in the Missouri Valley Conference, the Bluejays boasted 12 Missouri Valley Conference Players of the Year, 11 Missouri Valley Conference Defensive Players of the Year, 13 Missouri Valley Conference Tournament Most Valuable Players, and 6 Missouri Valley Conference Coach of the Year Awards.

Big East Conference era (2013–present)
On March 20, 2013, the Creighton administration announced that the school would join the Big East Conference in July 2013. In their first season in the conference, the Bluejays finished fifth in regular season play and lost in the first round of the 2013 Big East Men's Soccer Tournament, but did make their 21st appearance in the NCAA Division I Men's Soccer Tournament.

In 2014, the Creighton men's soccer team clinched the 2014 Big East Conference Regular Season Championship after posting a 7–1–1 conference record and defeating Providence by a score of 3 – 0 in the final regular season game of the year. However, Providence exacted its revenge a week later; beating the Bluejays 1 – 0 and ousting them from the 2014 Big East Men's Soccer Tournament in the second round. Despite the loss, Creighton was chosen as the 12th seed in the 2014 NCAA Division I Men's Soccer Championship with an at-large invitation, giving the team a bye into the second round of the tournament. In the 2014 NCAA Tournament, the Bluejays advanced to the Elite 8, or Quarterfinals Round, by defeating Oregon State 1 – 0 in the second round, and knocking out conference rival Xavier by a score of 2 – 1 in the third round of the tournament. In the 2014 Elite 8, the men's soccer team played UMBC to a double-overtime scoreless draw before conceding 4 – 5 in a penalty shootout. Creighton ended the 2014 season with a final overall record of 16–3–3.

Stadium

Since 2003, Creighton has played their home matches on campus at Morrison Stadium, a 6,000-seat soccer-specific stadium, which is named after former university President Fr. Michael Morrison, S.J. The men's soccer team played their first match at the new stadium on August 29, 2003, fighting to a thrilling double-overtime scoreless draw against Butler. The team would have to wait only two days to notch their first victory at their new home grounds, defeating Furman 3–1 on August 31, 2003.

The Creighton men's soccer team has enjoyed significant success at home since its return in to play in 1990. As of 2014, the Bluejays’ home record is 203–35–20 for an impressive winning percentage of .826 since 1990. As of 2014, the men's soccer team, who annually rank among NCAA leaders in attendance for home games, are 101–19–15 (.804) overall and 36–6–3 (.834) in conference play all-time at Morrison Stadium. As of 2014, Creighton is an impressive 71–9–4 (.869) at home all-time in regular-season conference play.

Coaching
Creighton's current men's soccer coach is Johnny Torres.

Prior to Bolowich, Jamie Clark led the Bluejays for one season, 2010, in which they compiled a 13–5–2 and returned to the NCAA tournament with an at-large bid after being left out during the 2009 season, breaking a streak of 17 consecutive NCAA appearances.

Prior to Clark's only season at the helm, Creighton has had only two other head coaches since the reinstatement of the program in 1990. They are current Stanford University head coach Bret Simon, who was head coach of Creighton from 1995 to 2000 and current Penn State head coach Bob Warming, who was head coach of Creighton from 1990 to 1994 and 2001 to 2009.

Prior to the team's inactive period, from 1986 to 1989, the Bluejays were coached by Mark Schmechel from 1979 to 1980, Wayne Rasmussen from 1981 to –1982, and Don Klosterman from 1983 to 1985.

 Rivalries 
The main rival for Creighton is University of Nebraska Omaha, the only other NCAA Division I men's soccer program in Nebraska. The rivalry is known as the "Dodge Street Derby".

 Dodge Street Derby (Omaha) 

Source: Creighton Men's Soccer Record Book

Record by year
References:

Team honorsBig East Conference Regular Season Champions (2): 2014, 2018Missouri Valley Conference Regular Season Champions (12): 1992, 1993, 1994, 1995, 1996, 2003, 2006, 2007, 2008, 2010, 2011, 2012Missouri Valley Conference Tournament Champions (13): 1992, 1993, 1994, 1995, 1997, 1998, 2000, 2002, 2005, 2006, 2008, 2011, 2012NCAA Tournament Appearances (22): 1992, 1993, 1994, 1995, 1996, 1997, 1998, 1999, 2000, 2001, 2002, 2003, 2004, 2005, 2006, 2007, 2008, 2010, 2011, 2012, 2013, 2014, 2015, 2016, 2021NCAA College Cup Appearances (5): 1996, 2000, 2002, 2011, 2012NCAA College Cup Runner-Up (1):''' 2000

Player honors
Through the years, many Bluejays have gone on to play professionally, and twenty have been named All-Americans for their play at Creighton:

All-Americans

First Team

Fabian Herbers – 2014
Jose Gomez – 2012
Andrew Ribeiro – 2012 
Ethan Finlay –  2011
Brian Holt – 2011
Andrei Gotsmanov – 2008

Mike Tranchilla – 2002
David Wright – 1999
Richard Mulrooney – 1998
Johnny Torres – 1996*, 1997*†
Keith DeFini – 1993
Brian Kamler – 1993

 * = National Player of the Year
 † = Herman Trophy Winner

Second Team

Timo Pitter – 2014
Jose Ribas – 2014
Andrew Duran – 2011
Greg Jordan – 2011

Ethan Finlay – 2010
Chris Schuler – 2008
Brian Mullan – 2000
Brian Kamler – 1991

Third Team

Matt Wieland – 2005
Tom Zawislan – 1999

Brian Kamler – 1992

There have been two former Bluejays who have earned at least one cap for the U.S. National Team, Brian Mullan and Richard Mulrooney.

Current Creighton assistant coach Johnny Torres is the only Creighton player to win the Hermann Trophy, doing so in 1997. The Hermann Trophy is awarded annually by the Missouri Athletic Club to the nation's best men's college soccer player.

Former Bluejays in the MLS
Player (Current Team if Active)

Charles Auguste (Houston Dynamo)
Mehdi Ballouchy
Steve Bernal
Andrew Duran
Ethan Finlay (Austin FC)
Fabian Herbers (Chicago Fire)
Daniel Hernández
Lance Hill
Brian Holt
Greg Jordan
Ryan Junge
Brent Kallman (Minnesota United FC)
Brian Kamler
Michael Kraus

Eric Miller (Nashville SC)
Brian Mullan
Richard Mulrooney
Julian Nash
Ross Paule
Andrew Peterson
Tyler Polak
Angel Rivillo
Brett Rodriguez
Chris Schuler
Seth Sinovic
Johnny Torres
David Wagenfuhr

Numerous former Creighton men's soccer players have gone on to play in various professional soccer leagues outside of the MLS—both in the United States, including the United Soccer Leagues and North American Soccer League, and internationally.

Notes

References

External links